Robert Charles Ferguson (born December 17, 1979) is a former American football wide receiver who played in the National Football League. He was drafted by the Green Bay Packers in the second round of the 2001 NFL Draft. He played college football at Texas A&M.

Ferguson was also a member of the Minnesota Vikings, Atlanta Falcons and Omaha Nighthawks.

Early years
Ferguson played free safety and wide receiver at Spring Woods High School in Houston, where he was a four-time letter winner. He was named Defensive Player of the Year by the Houston Touchdown Club as a 1997 senior, when he made 96 tackles and 6 interceptions. On offense, he caught 32 passes for 999 yards and 5 touchdowns during his senior year. He won all-district and All-Greater Houston honors on both sides of the ball and was named offensive MVP of the Houston Coaches' Classic All-star game the summer after his senior year. He also earned four letters for the school's basketball team, earning all-district and all-city honors and ran track, where he was the district champion in the long jump.

College career
Originally signed as a safety with Texas A&M, grade troubles forced him to begin his career at Tyler Junior College. Was a junior college All-American in both 1998 and 1999 for TJC. He played safety and receiver but also spent time at cornerback and linebacker. He led the team with 36 receptions for 539 yards during his final year at Tyler.

He established himself as one of the best receivers in the Big 12 Conference while earning first-team conference honors and being named conference Newcomer of the Year during his lone season (2000) at Texas A&M. He was the conference leader in receptions per game and ranked No. 2 in receiving yards.

He was also named the Aggies' offensive MVP when he led the team in catches with 58, receiving yards with 885, receiving touchdowns with 6, and all-purpose yards with 885. His 58 catches ranked No. 5 in school history for a single season, his 885 receiving yards ranked No. 2 and his receiving TD total tied for No. 5. He had three 100-yard receiving games, including 174 against Wyoming which tied for No. 5 in school history. He also had a career-best 11 catches against Oklahoma State.

Professional career

Green Bay Packers
Ferguson was drafted in the second round of the 2001 NFL Draft. He played sparingly in his first year but slowly progressed. 2003 was his best year statistically as he caught 38 passes for 520 yards and 4 touchdowns.

On December 19, 2004, Ferguson sustained a sprained neck and briefly lost feeling in his legs after a clothesline tackle by Jacksonville Jaguars safety Donovin Darius, who was ejected and fined $75,000 for the hit.

On December 19, 2005, he caught Aaron Rodgers' first passing yards, since Rodgers' first completion earlier in the season was for zero (0) yards.

Minnesota Vikings
He was released by the Packers in 2007 and picked up by the Minnesota Vikings. He was released after the 2008 season.

Atlanta Falcons 
Ferguson signed with the Atlanta Falcons on August 6, 2009 after wide receiver Harry Douglas suffered a season-ending knee injury. He was released at the end of preseason.

Omaha Nighthawks
Ferguson was signed by the Omaha Nighthawks of the United Football League on August 21, 2010.

Personal life

Legal Trouble 
Ferguson and his wife, Tiffany Ferguson, were accused of assaulting Demond Demas and Demas' relative, shortly after Demas was accused of assaulting his girlfriend.

References

1979 births
Living people
Players of American football from Houston
American football wide receivers
American football return specialists
Texas A&M Aggies football players
Green Bay Packers players
Minnesota Vikings players
Atlanta Falcons players
Tyler Apaches football players
Omaha Nighthawks players